The Last Duane is a 2014 American Western film directed by Chris Ekstein, starring Jason Patric, Danny Trejo, Rose McGowan, Keith David, and Martin Copping. It is produced by Stacy Ekstein.

Plot 
Buck Duane inherited his legendary father's skill with a gun as well as his knack for finding trouble. Attacked by a jealous rival over a girl, Buck defends himself and is forced to live as an outlaw, constantly on the run from the black and white justice of the Texas Rangers. But when he seeks redemption by rescuing an enslaved Indian girl from a vicious criminal and his gang of outlaws, he's pushed into further violence, and the understanding that he may be no better than the worst of them. As penance for his crimes and the deaths he's caused, Buck agrees to give himself over to service in the Texas Rangers, working in constant peril as a sanctioned vigilante. He lives as an outlaw in order to root them out, dealing justice and vengeance for his dead friends and all the weak and helpless folk of Texas.

Cast 
Jason Patric as Kip Duane
Danny Trejo as Espada
Rose McGowan as Madeline
Keith David as Euchre
Mark Boone Junior as Gus Andrews
Martin Copping as Kid Fuller
Marisa Coughlan as Mary Duane
Anthony De Longis as Jeff Ake
Jeff Daniel Phillips as Sol White
Noah Harden as Young Buck Duane
Kari Nissena as Annabelle
Ardeshir Radpour as Gang Member
Clay Walker as Ranger Perkins
Lori Mixson as Eleanor Bain
Mary E. Fry as The Proper Lady
Angela Francis as Saloon Girl
David Lee Jensen as Jack Rabbit Benson
Laura Lee as Proper Lady

See also
List of western films

References

External links
 

2014 films
2014 Western (genre) films
American Western (genre) films
2010s American films